Woodleigh may refer to:
Places
Woodleigh, Devon, England
Woodleigh, Queensland, a locality in Toowoomba Region, Australia
Woodleigh, South Australia, Australia
Woodleigh, Victoria, Australia
Woodleigh railway station, Victoria, a nonoperational railway station on the Wonthaggi line in South Gippsland
Schools
Woodleigh School, North Yorkshire, an English independent preparatory school located in the village of Langton, North Yorkshire, England
Woodleigh School, New Zealand, a coeducational contributing primary school, in Frankleigh Park, New Zealand
Other
Woodleigh crater, a large meteorite impact crater in Western Australia
Woodleigh MRT station, a station on Singapore's Mass Rapid Transit system
Woodleigh Replicas, a former park of miniatures in Prince Edward Island, Canada